The Ceres Community Project is a U.S. non-profit organization that mentors teens in nutrient-dense food preparation as well as chef, employment, and business skills, then works with volunteers to deliver the food to people with life-threatening illnesses and their families. Ceres also includes a garden to grow produce for the program. The organization has also partnered with other non-profit organizations such as the Work Horse Organic Agriculture (WHOA), which supplies organic produce and eggs to Ceres.

The program has had significant impacts on both the teen chefs and the clients, with increases of fruit and vegetables and decreases in unhealthy food consumption in both groups. Ceres has also served as a model for similar projects in other communities such as in Chicago and Cleveland.

History
Cathryn Couch, a former professional chef, founded Ceres after taking a friend's daughter as an apprentice to cook for a friend who had stage 2 breast cancer.

References

Bibliography

External links

Youth organizations based in California
Nonprofit youth organizations based in the United States
American food and drink organizations
Community organizations
Community gardening in California
Charities based in California
Organizations established in 2007